The Brevard Museum of History & Natural Science is located at 2201 Michigan Avenue, Cocoa, Florida.  The museum includes a 14,750 sq/ft facility that houses artifacts from the region and a 22-acre nature preserve. The displays include a Florida timeline and rotating temporary exhibits.  The museum features the remains of the "Windover Woman", the oldest human remains found on the North American continent, a re-creation of the Windover Dig, a "wet" archaeological site, and an Ice Age exhibit featuring creatures that once roamed Florida. A visitor may see how Native Americans lived and Florida pioneers survived.  As of 2013, the museum had over 3,000 artifacts.

In September 2014, The Florida Historical Society became the museum's parent organization.

Notes

External links
Brevard Museum of History & Natural Science (Official Website)

Cocoa, Florida
Museums in Brevard County, Florida
Natural history museums in Florida
Florida Native American Heritage Trail
Paleontology in Florida
1969 establishments in Florida
Museums established in 1969